Klaudia Dudová (born 2 September 1988) is a Czech actress of Roma origin.  Dudová starred in the award-winning film The Way Out.

Selected filmography
 We Are Never Alone (2016)

External links

1988 births
Living people
Czech film actresses
Czech Romani people
Indian film actresses
Place of birth missing (living people)
Czech people of Romani descent
21st-century Czech actresses
People from Levice
Czech Lion Awards winners